Ab Douglas Driediger (born 1930 in Molln, Germany) is a former Canadian television news anchor. He co-anchored the first CTV National News program with Baden Langdon (later with Peter Jennings) in November 1962.

Writings

References 

Canadian television news anchors
1930 births
Living people
CTV Television Network people
20th-century Canadian journalists